Travis Allan Blankenhorn (born August 3, 1996) is an American professional baseball second baseman in the Washington Nationals organization. He has previously played in MLB for the Minnesota Twins and New York Mets.

Amateur career
Blankenhorn attended Pottsville Area High School in Pottsville, Pennsylvania. Blankenhorn was a three sport standout high school athlete in football, basketball in baseball. He committed to play college baseball at the University of Kentucky. He was drafted by the Minnesota Twins in the third round of the 2015 Major League Baseball draft.

Professional career

Minnesota Twins
After signing, Blankenhorn made his professional debut with the Gulf Coast Twins and he was later promoted to the Elizabethton Twins. He posted a combined .244 batting average with three home runs and 23 RBIs in 53 games between both clubs. Blankenhorn spent 2016 with both Elizabethon and the Cedar Rapids Kernels where he batted a combined .293 with ten home runs and 41 RBIs in 59 games with both teams. In 2017, he returned to Cedar Rapids, slashing .251/.343/.441 with 13 home runs and 69 RBIs in 118 games, earning Midwest League All-Star honors.

Blankenhorn spent 2018 with the Fort Myers Miracle. In June, he was named a Florida State League All-Star and won the Home Run Derby with 31 home runs. In 124 games with Fort Myers, he hit .231 with 11 home runs and 57 RBIs. He returned to Fort Myers to begin the 2019 season before being promoted to the Pensacola Blue Wahoos with whom he was named to the Southern League All-Star Game. Over 108 games between the two clubs, he slashed .277/.321/.466 with 19 home runs and 54 RBIs. Blankenhorn was named the second baseman of the year in the Southern League at the conclusion of the season.

Blankenhorn was added to the Twins 40-man roster on November 20, 2019. On September 14, 2020, Blankenhorn was promoted to the major leagues for the first time. He made his major league debut the next day against the Chicago White Sox, and picked up his first major league hit off of Matt Foster. Blankenhorn only appeared in 1 game for the Twins in 2021. On May 8, 2021, Blankenhorn was designated for assignment.

Los Angeles Dodgers
On May 14, 2021, Blankenhorn was claimed off waivers by the Los Angeles Dodgers. In 3 at-bats for the Triple-A Oklahoma City Dodgers, he went hitless. He was designated for assignment on May 21.

Seattle Mariners
On May 24, 2021, Blankenhorn was claimed off waivers by the Seattle Mariners and assigned to the Triple-A Tacoma Rainiers. In 20 at-bats for Tacoma, Blankenhorn notched 5 hits with 1 home run and 5 RBI.

New York Mets
On June 1, 2021, Blankenhorn was claimed off waivers by the New York Mets. He made his debut the following day, coming in as a defensive substitute for Jonathan Villar. On June 11, he was optioned to the Triple-A Syracuse Mets.

On July 17, Blankenhorn recorded his first career RBI and scored his first run. On July 18, in a game against the Pittsburgh Pirates, Blankenhorn hit his first career home run, a 425-foot, 3-run shot off of pitcher J. T. Brubaker. He appeared in 23 total games for the Mets in 2021, batting .174/.208/.391 with a home run and 4 RBI.

Blankenhorn was designated for assignment on April 5, 2022, after the Mets signed John Curtiss. He cleared waivers and was sent outright to Triple-A Syracuse on April 8.

On July 22, 2022, Blankenhorn's contract was selected by the Mets. He was designated for assignment on July 23. He elected free agency on November 10, 2022.

Washington Nationals
On December 14, 2022, Blankenhorn signed a minor league deal with the Washington Nationals.

Personal life
Blankenhorn and his wife, Maci, married in 2020.

References

External links

1996 births
Living people
Sportspeople from Pottsville, Pennsylvania
Baseball players from Pennsylvania
Major League Baseball second basemen
Minnesota Twins players
New York Mets players
Gulf Coast Twins players
Elizabethton Twins players
Cedar Rapids Kernels players
Fort Myers Miracle players
Salt River Rafters players
Pensacola Blue Wahoos players
Oklahoma City Dodgers players
Tacoma Rainiers players
St. Paul Saints players
Syracuse Mets players